Baal-tamar (“Lord of the Palm”)  is a place of uncertain identification near Gibeah, mentioned the Book of Judges in the account of the battle between the Tribe of Benjamin and the other tribes of Israel.

Eusebius (Onomastica Sacra, 238, § 75) knew Baaltamar under the name of "Beth-thamar"; but at the present day it can not be located.

References

External links
 
 Definition at die.net

Hebrew Bible places